Motherhead Bug was an American rock music group founded in 1989 in New York City by singer and trombone player David Ouimet and bass guitarist Tony Lee.

Band history
Ouimet had earlier founded industrial rock group Cop Shoot Cop, and Lee was a member of blues rockers Railroad Jerk.

The group was rather large, featuring three drummers, as well as string and horn sections, with accordions, xylophones and other unusual instruments featured prominently. The music is somewhat similar to Tom Waits' post-Swordfishtrombones, but also touched on music hall songs, nursery rhymes, marching bands, and earned comparisons to the Penguin Cafe Orchestra.

Motherhead Bug released only two singles and one full-length album, 1993's Zambodia, recorded by Brooklyn-based producer Martin Bisi. The album was dedicated to saxophonist Masami Shinoda. One critic described Zambodia  as follows: "The instrumentation and Ouimet's theatrical vocals lend a decadent grandeur to Weill-esque numbers like 'Demon Erection' and 'My Sweet Milstar.' It may be burlesque, but it's still pretty scary stuff."

Aftermath
The project was abandoned after Zambodia'''s release due to the inability to manage so many band members. Ouimet stopped writing music and focused on working on children's books, although he would occasionally appear as a guest musician. He would not work as a full-time member of a band until the release of Firewater's Get Off the Cross... album in 1996. Michele Amar's similar musical project, Sulfur, released Delirium Tremens in 1998 which was co-written by Ouimet and featured some of the same musicians that performed on Zambodia''.

Discography

Studio albums

Singles

Compilation appearances

References

External links
Built on a Weak Spot
Goldenfly Records
Perte et Fracas

Punk rock groups from New York (state)
American experimental rock groups
Musical groups established in 1989
Gypsy punk groups